Cache Creek is a historic transportation junction and incorporated village  northeast of Vancouver in British Columbia, Canada. It is on the Trans-Canada Highway in the province of British Columbia at a junction with Highway 97.  The same intersection and the town that grew around it was at the point on the Cariboo Wagon Road where a branch road, and previously only a trail, led east to Savona's Ferry on Kamloops Lake. This community is also the point at which a small stream, once known as Riviere de la Cache, joins the Bonaparte River.

The name is derived, apparently, from a cache or buried and hidden supply and trade goods depot used by the fur traders of either the Hudson's Bay Company or its rival the North West Company. Although it was first incorporated as a Local District municipality with the name Cache Creek in 1959, the name has been associated with this community since long before incorporation. The Cache Creek post office was established in 1868.

The nearby fossil locality, the McAbee fossil beds, is noted for the wide diversity of Eocene plants and animals preserved in the shale, including the extinct plants Dillhoffia and Trochodendron drachukii. The town lends its name to significant geological features, dating back to the Carboniferous, whose rocks are exposed in the area, Cache Creek Terrane and Cache Creek Ocean.

The town is also served by CFMA-FM 105.9, a community radio station run by the Ash-Creek Television Society.

Demographics 

See also
Cache Creek Terrane

References

External links

Villages in British Columbia
Populated places in the Thompson-Nicola Regional District
Thompson Country